Yonekawa ( or ) may refer to:

 Akihiro Yonekawa (born 1972), Japanese wrestler and singer, better known as Kesen Numajiro
 Yonekawa Station, railway station in Iwakuni, Yamaguchi, Japan